Gabriel Christoni Leite (born December 28, 1987 in Curitiba)  is a Brazilian football goalkeeper, who plays for Paysandu.

Contract
January 1, 2008 to December 31, 2010

External links

1987 births
Living people
Footballers from Curitiba
Brazilian footballers
Paraná Clube players
Esporte Clube São Bento players
Ituano FC players
União Agrícola Barbarense Futebol Clube players
Oeste Futebol Clube players
Luverdense Esporte Clube players
Operário Ferroviário Esporte Clube players
Clube Atlético Sorocaba players
Boa Esporte Clube players
Red Bull Brasil players
Associação Ferroviária de Esportes players
Paysandu Sport Club players
Campeonato Brasileiro Série B players
Campeonato Brasileiro Série C players
Campeonato Brasileiro Série D players
Association football goalkeepers